The Queen Hith Plantation Complex Site is a historic archaeological site in the Oakland Farm area of Newport News, Virginia. It is the site of the central complex of Thomas Harwood's extensive plantation, established some time after his arrival at Jamestown in 1622. The site includes the foundational remnants of his 1643 house.

See also
National Register of Historic Places listings in Newport News, Virginia

References

Archaeological sites on the National Register of Historic Places in Virginia
National Register of Historic Places in Newport News, Virginia